Club Deportivo Comarca de Níjar is a football team based in Níjar, Spain. Founded in 2000, the team plays in Tercera División – Group 9.

The club's home ground is Estadio Municipal Comarca de Níjar with 850 seats.

History
The club was founded through a merger between UD San Isidro de Níjar & CB Campohermoso. AD Comarca de Níjar was used only for 2000–01 season.

Season to season

10 seasons in Tercera División

Former players
 Fernando Pierucci
 Edwin Muñoz
 Sena
 Michele Marani

External links
Official website 
Futbolme.com profile 
LaPreferente.com profile 

Football clubs in Andalusia
Association football clubs established in 2000
2000 establishments in Spain
Province of Almería